Lofty Brits (10 July 1926 – 6 April 2000) was a South African cricketer. He played in two first-class matches for Border in 1950/51.

See also
 List of Border representative cricketers

References

External links
 

1926 births
2000 deaths
South African cricketers
Border cricketers
Cricketers from East London, Eastern Cape